Jean Bernard may refer to:
 Jean Bernard (physician) (1907–2006), French hematologist
 Father Jean Bernard (1907–1994), Catholic priest who survived the Nazi concentration camp at Dachau
 Jean-François Bernard (born 1962), former French professional road bicycle racer

See also
 Jean-Bernard, a French masculine given name